Ted Atherton is a Canadian actor. He is best known as Myles Leland III in the TV series Sue Thomas: F.B.Eye.

Early life
He moved with his family to Scarborough, Ontario when he was 13. He went to the University of Toronto and obtained a bachelor's degree in English and Drama. He was also a member of the advanced actors workshop at the Banff Centre for three years.

Career
Atherton acted in the movie and television series "Nothing Too Good for a Cowboy" in 1998.  He also starred in the Prairie Theatre Exchange's comedic production, Bingo! in 2011.

Filmography

Television

Film

Video games

References

External links 

Living people
Canadian male film actors
Canadian male television actors
Canadian male voice actors
20th-century Canadian male actors
21st-century Canadian male actors
Year of birth missing (living people)